Bruce Pickens (born May 9, 1968) is a former professional American football cornerback who played four seasons in the National Football League (NFL) for the Atlanta Falcons, Green Bay Packers, Kansas City Chiefs, and Oakland Raiders.

A New York Times pre-draft assessment of the 5-10, 192 lb. cornerback that ran a 4.48: "A junior-college transfer who hasn't been exposed to top passing offenses and is somewhat raw in overall development but has the best physical skill of the DBs this year. Very athletic."

References

1968 births
Living people
Players of American football from Kansas City, Missouri
American football cornerbacks
Atlanta Falcons players
Green Bay Packers players
Kansas City Chiefs players
Oakland Raiders players
Nebraska Cornhuskers football players
Coffeyville Red Ravens football players